Silver is an action role-playing video game for Microsoft Windows, Dreamcast and Mac OS X, released in 1999. The game was produced by Infogrames initially for Windows, and later for the Dreamcast. The story focuses around a young warrior called David and his quest to retrieve his wife from the clutches of the villain Silver. On his journey he gains a number of followers and visits many different landscapes. The game sold over 400,000 copies.

Silver features polygonal 3D characters drawn against a pre-rendered 2D background. The character design is inspired by manga/anime culture. The battle system of Silver is notable for being completely real-time, as opposed to many similar light role-playing games, which usually have turn-based combat. The player may choose any character in the adventuring party to control, and the rest of the characters are handled automatically by AI. The story focuses largely on collecting eight magic orbs representing different elements: Fire, Ice, Health, Earth, Acid, Lightning, Time and Light. Each orb is located at an area themed around the orb, and the player may use the collected orbs to cast different kind of spells against enemies.

The game was distributed with PCs sold by Tiny Computers, a computer company based in England and founded in 1990 which went into administration in 2002. Silver was re-released in 2012 on GOG.com and in 2017 on Steam with added support for macOS and Linux.

Plot
Silver takes place in the island region of Jarrah, commonly known as the 'Wheel of Life' for the fact that it is shaped like a wheel. Jarrah is controlled by Silver, an evil sorcerer residing on an island of blood. Fortunately, not all of Jarrah is under his cruel influence. In the faraway Forest of Verdante, David, a young man, peacefully lives together with his wife Jennifer and his grandfather.

The story line begins as Silver decides to take a new bride. He orders his army to bring all women to his island, so he can pick any woman he desires. David's wife Jennifer is kidnapped personally by Silver's son Fuge, who seems to know David's grandfather from the past. Together with his grandfather, David leaves the forest to free his wife, but they come too late. His wife is already on a ship that just left the harbor. They hear rumors about the resistance, a rebel group with the goal to finally set an end to Silver's reign.

After a brief civil encounter with the rebel group in Haven, David and his grandfather journey to the Archives of Gno. On top of the archives lies a giant telescope, able to see where the ship with the captured women is heading. During their exploration they meet Teronus, who gives David a magic ice wand. On their way back, they are confronted again by Fuge, who kills David's grandfather and unveils that he also killed David's father (Fuge mocks David to fight him, but doing so will result in David's death). David kills the demon in the library cellar, freeing the building from the infestation and enabling the telescope.

After his escape, David, now full of pain and anger, finally joins the rebels to fight Silver. They make a coordinated move on Rain, a huge city, only to barely miss the galleon carrying the women. William (who lost his wife Camille at the start of the game) is furious and leaves, while the others meet at the Oracle.

As prophecy foretold, Silver can only be defeated by collecting eight magic spheres, each resembling another region of Jarrah: Fire, Ice, Earth, Lightning, Poison, Regeneration, Time and Light. Together with his new rebel friends, David starts his search for the spheres. Also in knowledge of the prophecy, Silver previously found some of the spheres and sealed them in other castles under his control, but most of them are still lost. Thus, David and his friends have to travel to differently themed locations like a lost underwater station or a castle made from ice. Most of the time, at the end of each path, a giant creature has to be defeated to obtain the respective sphere.

The first orb is given by Othias, a reluctant mage, waiting in Rain. The second is obtained on Winter from a frost giant, in one of the larger Ice caves. Spires houses the healing orb - an underwater city in which Silver's guards are laying in ambush. Ruben's home contains the fourth (lightning), while earth and acid are found in Glass' palace and the Sewers respectively. Glass later reveals a hidden passage on Haven itself to get access to the time orb, while Atro (the outer part of Deadgate) awaits the player with the light orb, after killing the Queen of the Dead.

In David's absence and after obtaining the first five orbs, the rebels are led into a trap by Fuge, who murders most of them. After the group returns to the camp, they find out the rebel leader Duke has been captured in Chains. David makes plans to attack the dungeon Chains from behind, through the barracks. After fighting through most of the labyrinth, the group meets Fuge, who promptly stuns David's companions to force a one on one fight. David finally gets the better of him during one of the hardest fights in the game, and frees Duke.

After confronting Glass, Silver's daughter, whom the rebels had suspected of spying for her father, it comes to light that not only does she secretly resent her father for killing his wife (her mother) as shown in the introductory cutscene of the game, but she even reveals that one of the rebels is a traitor. Glass encourages them to go to Deadgate to find a rebel ghost in limbo, waiting for his retribution. They take a ship from Verdante and manage to find the dead rebel, who tells them it was William - in hopes of getting his wife back from Silver. Glass later teleports David and two companions of his choosing to Metalon, where they have to find Silver's source of power and drain the palace of a major blood source, further weakening the wizard.

It is revealed that Silver plans to seal a pact with the demon of apocalypse, first formed by his murdering of his own wife. By sacrificing every woman capable of child birth, Silver wants to appease the dark god Apocalypse and gain ultimate power. The story reaches its climax in Silver's throne room. William begs Silver to free his wife, but Silver only laughs and kills him. The final fight commences and with the aid of all eight spheres, David and his friends are able to defeat Silver. Nemesis appears and kills Silver in David's stead, seeing as he was too moral and reluctant to do it. 
However, the demon of apocalypse still threatens to end the world, with or without Silver. With the help of Nemesis, David defeats the demon, preventing the demon's apocalypse forever. Silver's fortress Metalon crumbles as the adventurers are making their escape while Glass teleports everyone to safety. David and his wife are reunited and the story ends with a bright future for the world Jarrah.

Aside from this main plot, there are many subplots which evolve around side characters and special locations of Jarrah.

Locations
Verdante is in the top-right corner of Jarrah. It is even more fertile than Haven, but its forests have been burned away or turned into swampland by battles against Silver. David's house, a monastery, and many forests await here. It is home to the Lightning orb.

Haven lies on the center of Jarrah. It is a very fertile island and has a lot of flora and fauna. In its center lie the Oracle's Tower and the Rebel Camp (a player may change the party members here). Later in the game, the Time orb is found in the ancient ruins.

Gno is an island which houses a big library with a large telescope at its top. The Library Of Gno also has caverns underneath it, and, in the beginning of the game, has a lot of trouble with imps and summoned demons.

Rain is the main city of Jarrah and has its name for a good reason: it never stops raining here. The large, dark city hosts several important places like Chains, Silver's dungeon, the pub and the harbor. The fire orb is found in a wizard's tower and the Acid/Poison orb is found in the sewers.

Winter, as the name foretells, is covered in snow and ice and is a key area in the game. It houses two orbs (Ice and Earth) and has caverns underneath, on top of which a big icy castle awaits (the property of Glass, Silver's daughter).

Spires is an underwater cathedral near Rain, which is Atlantis-themed. The enemies in Spires look like amphibians. The Healing Orb can be found here while battling a poison dragon.

Deadgate is the barren realm of the dead. When a person dies, his ghost will be sent to Deadgate until his death is avenged.

Atro is the northern exterior of Deadgate. It is an alien-themed realm where the final orb is found (Light). It is the most minor and unknown location in all of Jarrah.

Metalon is the last island visited in the game, and the location of Silver's palace. As its name suggests, the city that covers the entire island is made completely out of metal, with the exception of the palace. The island is pitted with rivers of blood, the source of Silver's power. The player can only reach this island by being teleported there by Silver's daughter, Glass. The player cannot leave after being teleported to Metalon.

Major characters
David is the game's protagonist. He lived with his wife Jennifer and his grandfather, until his wife was kidnapped by Fuge and the soldiers under his command. He is also a skilled fighter and learned the way of fighting from his grandfather. His father and grandfather are both killed by Fuge. During the game, he joins the rebels and sets off to find the eight magical orbs that will aid the player to defeat Silver.

Grandfather is a very experienced fighter. He accompanies David when his wife is kidnapped, and together they travel to Haven and Gno. In the library of Gno, he sacrifices himself so David can escape from Fuge.

Silver is the ruler of Jarrah and the main antagonist of the game. He has two children, Fuge and Glass. His palace in Metalon is also the source of his power, with the magic source and the blood river. He kills his wife with the excuse of being cheated.  He has a great lust for power, so he plans to form an alliance with the evil god of apocalypse.

Duke is the leader of the rebels who have their camp in Haven. He is captured by Silver's troops and David sets off to rescue him from Silver's dungeons. He is a patient, careful man and a good strategist.

Fuge is Silver's son and the second antagonist of the game. He is an extremely powerful fighter and even his name causes fear in all around Jarrah. He follows his father's orders strictly and is extremely loyal to him. He kills David's father and grandfather, and is killed by David in a one-on-one fight.

Glass is Silver's daughter. She is a powerful sorceress and lives in the ice palace of Winter. Her dragon guards the earth orb. Since the murder of her mother by Silver, she hates Silver and even aids the rebels by teleporting David and his companions to Metalon.

The Chronicler: The player can save the game by telling the chronicler of the party's adventures. In the game's introductory cutscene, it is implied that the plot itself has been chronicled in the story of a book.

Companions
Sekune is the female fighter in the rebel camp. She is especially skilled in long-range weapons, and travels with David when the rebels enter Rain. It is unknown how she avoided capture by Fuge and his guards along with most of the women of Jarah, but it is likely that she saved herself thanks to her training.

Vivienne is another female fighter who David knew for a long time. Her sister was kidnapped by Fuge, but Vivienne was able to save herself thanks to her combat training.

Jug is a barbarian-like warrior David meets in the tavern of Rain. He is exceptionally strong, though not skilled in magic.

Cagen is one of the monks from the monastery who survived the madness that spread amongst the monks. He is dexterous and skilled in unarmed martial arts and magic.

Chiaro is a wizard apprentice. After learning from David that his master was killed by Silver, he joins the rebels. While not very strong, he is exceptionally skilled in magic.

Reception

The game received above-average reviews on both platforms according to the review aggregation website GameRankings. John Lee of NextGens January 2000 issue called the PC original "A good way to spend a promising (k)night." Nine issues later, Greg Orlando of the same magazine said of the Dreamcast port, "Grand in scale but mundane in delivery, Silver shines like bronze. The PC RPG-gone-console game provides a fine fusion of strict sword-and-sorcery questing with Final Fight-style, weapons-based brawling, but ultimately the game trips over itself, sometimes with gusto." PlanetDreamcast gave the same console version a mixed review, over a month before the game was released Stateside.

Anthony Baise of AllGame gave the PC version four stars out of five, calling it "an amazing game. It has a great plot, great action and more than a few surprises. It is not perfect but its developers came close." However, Jason White gave the Dreamcast version three stars out of five, saying, "This really isn't a bad game but it could have been much better. There is a lot to do in the game so you'll be playing for a few days but once you're done, that's it. So if you've got the time, give it a rent." Edge gave the PC version seven out of ten, saying, "Essentially, Silver just wants to sit you on its knee and spin you a yarn, rather than give you the freedom to make one for yourself. But as long as you accept that, you'll find it a refreshingly light alternative to the usual PC RPG fare." However, Neil Mouneimne of Computer Games Strategy Plus gave the same PC version two-and-a-half stars out of five, calling it "one of those games you have to truly struggle to love no matter how much you want to. It is a package of beauty, plot, and style poised to rival the best from Japan. Yet crash bugs, gameplay bugs, a frustrating combat system and an even more annoying save game system put an awful taint on what rightfully should have been a five-star gaming experience."

Ben Griffin of PC Gamer UK wrote in his retroview, "With Final Fantasy VIII, Suikoden II, Baldur’s Gate II and Diablo II as contemporaries, Silver was somewhat lost in the shuffle. In my opinion, it was better than all of them," and praised the characters, the writing and the control-based combat. He ended his article saying "for those who do remember it—its great characters and innovative controls—Silver shines bright."

The PC version was nominated for GameSpots 1999 "Best Music" award, which ultimately went to Homeworld. It was also a finalist for the "Outstanding Achievement in Original Music Composition" award at the Academy of Interactive Arts & Sciences' 3rd Annual Interactive Achievement Awards, which went to Um Jammer Lammy.

References

External links

Silvie, an unofficial asset extractor for Silver

1999 video games
Classic Mac OS games
Dreamcast games
Infogrames games
Linux games
MacOS games
Role-playing video games
Single-player video games
Spiral House games
Video games developed in the United Kingdom
Video games set on fictional islands
Windows games